Sparganothina xanthista is a species of moth of the family Tortricidae. It is found in Guerrero, Mexico.

The length of the forewings is 7.8-9.1 mm for males and 9.3 mm for females. The forewings are yellowish orange with brown markings and a few orange scales. The hindwings are white with a faint yellowish terminal line at the apex and termen.

References

Moths described in 1913
Sparganothini